George Eugene Trahern (born June 29, 1936), was an American politician who was a member of the Oregon House of Representatives and Oregon State Senate.

Trahern was born in Grants Pass, Oregon and was a real estate appraiser. He served in the House from 1981 until he was appointed to the state senate, serving briefly for one session in 1988.

References

1936 births
Living people
Republican Party Oregon state senators
Republican Party members of the Oregon House of Representatives
People from Grants Pass, Oregon
People from Deschutes County, Oregon